Durgaa is a 1985 Indian Hindi-language film directed by Shibu Mitra. It stars Hema Malini in the title role, along with Ashok Kumar, Pran, Raj Babbar, Aruna Irani in pivotal roles. Rajesh Khanna made a special appearance here. The music is by Sonik Omi.

Plot
Durgaa (Hema Malini), the only daughter of Dinanath (Ashok Kumar), is a soft-spoken girl who is exploited by various men in her life. At first, Durgaa falls in love Sunil Narayan (Raj Babbar) and even marries him. But she realises after marriage that her husband had married her only as an excuse to sleep with her. Durgaa sees her husband romancing and sleeping with other girls. Her husband tries to get Durgaa into trouble by hatching a plan to get her name tagged as a prostitute. She is then accused of murdering an innocent girl but seeks the help of a senior kind-hearted Jagannath (Pran) to bear her court expenses so that she can fight the injustice against her. She is introduced to Advocate Mohan (Rajesh Khanna), who has the reputation of winning every case he handles and so is hired as the advocate representing Durgaa. But Durgaa is not aware of the motive of the old man in helping her. The rest of the story is why Mohan was hired as the advocate by that old man, what the motive of the old man helping Durgaa was, will Durgaa ever forgive her husband, who murdered the girl etc. In the end Durgaa takes revenge on the devils in her life and Mohan marries Durgaa.

Cast
Ashok Kumar as Dinanath
Rajesh Khanna as Mohan
Raj Babbar as Sunil Narayan
Hema Malini as Durga
Aruna Irani as Sherry
Pran as Jagannath

Track list

References

External links
 

1985 films
1985 action films
1980s Hindi-language films
Films scored by Sonik-Omi
Fictional portrayals of police departments in India
Films directed by Shibu Mitra